Diego Sersale (died 14 July 1665) was a Roman Catholic prelate who served as Archdiocese of Bari-Canosa (1638–1665).

Biography
On 20 December 1638, Diego Sersale was appointed during the papacy of Pope Urban VIII as Archdiocese of Bari-Canosa. On 21 December 1638, he was consecrated bishop by Alessandro Cesarini (iuniore), Cardinal-Deacon of Sant'Eustachio, with Tommaso Carafa, Bishop Emeritus of Vulturara e Montecorvino, and Giovanni Battista Altieri, Bishop Emeritus of Camerino, serving as co-consecrators. He served as Bishop of Bari-Canosa until his death on 14 July 1665.

Episcopal succession
While bishop, he was the principal co-consecrator of:
Andrea Borgia, Bishop of Segni (1643); 
Alfonso Maurelli, Archbishop of Cosenza (1643); 
Antonio Marullo, Archbishop of Manfredonia (1643); 
Alessandro Pallavicini, Bishop of Borgo San Donnino (1660); and 
Francisco Antonio Díaz de Cabrera, Bishop of Salamanca (1660).

See also
Catholic Church in Italy

References

External links and additional sources
 (for Chronology of Bishops) 
 (for Chronology of Bishops) 

17th-century Roman Catholic archbishops in the Kingdom of Naples
Bishops appointed by Pope Urban VIII
1665 deaths